Seppo Johannes Ahokainen (born January 19, 1952) is a Finnish retired professional ice hockey player. who played in the SM-liiga for Ilves and Tappara as well for the Finland national team. He was inducted into the Finnish Hockey Hall of Fame in 1993.

External links

Finnish Hockey Hall of Fame bio

1952 births
Living people
Finnish ice hockey forwards
Ice hockey players at the 1976 Winter Olympics
Ilves players
EC KAC players
Olympic ice hockey players of Finland
People from Lauritsala
SaiPa players
Tappara players
Sportspeople from South Karelia